The Klasies River Caves are a series of caves located to the east of the Klasies River mouth on the Tsitsikamma coast in the Humansdorp district of Eastern Cape Province, South Africa. The three main caves and two shelters at the base of a high cliff have revealed evidence of middle stone age-associated human habitation from approximately 125,000 years ago. Around 75,000 years ago, during cave remodelling, the stratigraphic sediments were moved out into external middens.

In 2015, the South African government submitted a proposal to add the caves to the list of World Heritage Sites.

From 1960, Ronald Singer, Ray Inskeep, John Wymer, Hilary Deacon, Richard Klein and others suggested the excavation yielded the earliest known evidence of behaviourally modern humans. 
Further analysis suggested that the specimens fall "outside the range of modern variation".

Morphology
Analysis of 14 proximal ulnar dimensions compared to morphological properties of African archaic humans, and Levantine Mousterian, archaic European humans, west Asian and, European Upper Paleolithic, African Epipaleolithic and recent modern human also of recent African descent suggests an archaic total morphological pattern for the KRM specimens. "MSA-associated humans from KRM may not be as modern as has been claimed from the craniofacial material".

The hominin specimens include cranial fragments, mandibles with teeth, and a few postcranial remains: ulna and five metatarsal bones.

Evidence for behavioural modernity 
There is extensive evidence of shellfish collecting; MSA stone artifact technology; gathering plants, roots and flowers for food; cooking plants, corms, seal, penguins, and antelope meat on hearths with fire; general organisation of the settlement; and land/veld management by fire.

The evidence also appears to indicate that their presence was seasonal or migratory. There is also evidence of cannibalism, charred and carved 'modern human' bones discarded with other food remnants.

While Middle Stone Age (MSA) assemblage associated with those people are described as anatomically modern, there is ongoing debate about when they were also behaviourally modern. There is a marked difference between the Paleolithic stone technology used in the earliest layers from 125,000 years ago, and the superior MST blades of the 70,000-year-old Howiesons Poort period that used raw material which had been 'mined' 20 kilometres inland. 
There is also a differentiation between the Paleolithic food detritus that accumulated underfoot inside the caves 125,000 years ago and the ejection of such detritus from the cave into external middens by the occupants of ca. 75,000 years ago, suggesting the development of rudimentary "housekeeping" by that time.

Cannibalistic Evidence
Frederick E. Grine, Sarah Wurz, and Curtis W. Marean have conducted research on the human remains found at the site, conducting research supported by the Leakey Foundation. The research reviewed the last decades of research and findings at the site, attempted to find a more concrete stratigraphic temporal association, and examined the existing cranial remains.  Most human fossils represent adults. Only three juvenile individuals are represented, each with a deciduous tooth. This compares with other MSA sites along the southern coast of South Africa, where human remains are predominantly juvenile, typically in the form of deciduous (possibly exfoliated) teeth.
The review pointed out and confirmed that some among the bone fragments of human, as well as animal, affiliation would appear to show signs of cooking, gnawing, and tampering by tools (resulting in incision marks and cuts). 

The remains suggesting cannibalism consist of the following: 

 two small parietal fragments that both appear charred
 a very small, gracile right mandibular corpus; the anterior of the corpus is discolored, possibly from charring, however the authors observed that there "are no signs of fire shrinkage.
 a moderately large (68 mm - 53 mm) piece of cranial vault, identified it as a piece of the right parietal. The ectocranial surface exhibits possible evidence of burning 
 Another a moderately large (ca. 55 mm -68 mm) piece of cranial vault. This piece is interpreted with high confidence as representing the inferoposterior corner of a right parietal. Discoloration, possibly due to burning, is evident on the ectocranial surface of this piece. 
 a small (ca. 40 - 35 mm) piece of cranial vault preserving a 15.5 mm long segment of a patent suture that exhibits a white-gray discoloration, suggestive of burning. The well-known frontal fragment was described and illustrated by Singer and Wymer, and by Rightmire and Deacon, all of whom stressed its morphological modernity that presented stone tool cut-marks crossing its squamous surface.
 A nearly complete right fifth metatarsal. The shaft is intact, but the ends are weathered. Rightmire have suggested that the end might have been gnawed upon. 
 a complete left second metatarsal that in several regions, the cortex is blackened, and the specimen gives the appearance of having been burned.
 edentulous symphysis and left corpus of a mandible. The specimen was blackened, possibly charred and its cracked appearance suggested firing.

These types of evidence cannot confirm with certainty that cannibalistic practices were being carried out at the site, but the coexistence of human and animal fragments and the high percentage of fragments from specious body parts (tending to be skull, metatarsals, lumbar sections, and forearm) tend to suggest that it is not coincidental.

Discovery and excavation
The artifacts and bones were originally reported by Paul Haslem and Ludwig Abel, then in 1960 Ray Inskeep and Ronald Singer identified the artifacts as Middle Stone Age. In 1967 and 1968 Ronald Singer and John Wymer started extensive excavations, with their initial findings published in 1972 by the University of Chicago Press. Since 1984 research has been continued by Hilary Deacon.

The site is now protected by the South African Heritage Resources Agency (SAHRA), and the Department of Environment Affairs and Tourism.

Locations 

The five caves are dotted eastwards along the coast within 2 kilometres of Klasies River mouth, and the complete stretch to Druipkelder Point is designated as a National heritage site.
(Locations – best viewed in Google Earth)
 Klasies River Mouth at 
 Klasies Main Site, Caves 1 & 2, at 
 Klasies Caves 3 & 4 at 
 Klasies Cave 5 at

See also
 Boomplaas Cave
 Jebel Irhoud – possibly the earliest known fossils of Homo sapiens, dated to circa 300,000 years ago.
 Omo remains – fossils of Homo sapiens, dated to circa 190,000 years ago.
 Herto remains – an extinct subspecies of Homo sapiens, dated to circa 160,000 years ago.

General:
 List of fossil sites (with link directory)
 List of hominina (hominid) fossils (with images)
 List of archaeological periods
 List of caves in South Africa
 Keurboomstrand, Western Cape

References

Citations

Sources

External links
 Unesco World Heritage listing for Pleistocene occupation sites of Klasies River, Border Cave, Wonderwerk Cave and comparable sites relating to the emergence of modern humans
 Prehistory of South Africa
 Images of Klasies material at the South Africa Museum

Archaeological sites in South Africa
Caves of South Africa
Landforms of the Eastern Cape
Middle Stone Age
Paleoanthropological sites
Pleistocene paleontological sites of Africa
Prehistoric cannibalism
Prehistoric South Africa
Protected areas of the Eastern Cape
Archaeology of Southern Africa